Northwestern Consolidated Milling Company Elevator A also known as the Ceresota Elevator and "The Million Bushel Elevator" was a receiving and public grain elevator built by the Northwestern Consolidated Milling Company in 1908 in Minneapolis, Minnesota in the United States. The elevator may have been the largest brick elevator ever constructed (brick construction being relatively uncommon) and ran on electricity. The elevator was the source for the Crown Roller Mill and Standard Mill. Those mills closed in the 1950s but the elevator continued in use for grain storage until the mid 1980s. The building is a contributing property of the Saint Anthony Falls Historic District listed in the National Register of Historic Places in 1971.

That required removing the vertical bin structure and  creating floors without destroying the building walls. Before the conversion the building was documented to Historic American Engineering Record standards. Conversion was sensitive to the building history and the building is still a contributing property.

About 2015 the building was converted to Millers Landing Senior Living.

See also 
Northwestern Consolidated Milling Company
List of contributing properties in the St. Anthony Falls Historic District

Notes

Further reading

External links
Ceresota Building at Emporis
Ceresota Building at Minnesota Department of Employment and Economic Development

Buildings and structures completed in 1908
Buildings and structures in Minneapolis
Grain elevators in Minnesota
Historic district contributing properties in Minnesota
National Register of Historic Places in Minneapolis
1908 establishments in Minnesota